Tjaša Oder (born 22 June 1994 in Slovenj Gradec) is a Slovenian swimmer. At the 2012 Summer Olympics, she competed in the Women's 800 metre freestyle, finishing in 25th place overall in the heats, failing to qualify for the final.

In 2019, she represented Slovenia at the 2019 World Aquatics Championships held in Gwangju, South Korea. She competed in the women's 800 metre freestyle and women's 1500 metre freestyle events. In both events she did not advance to compete in the final.

References

1994 births
Living people
Sportspeople from Slovenj Gradec
Slovenian female swimmers
Slovenian female freestyle swimmers
Olympic swimmers of Slovenia
Swimmers at the 2012 Summer Olympics
Swimmers at the 2016 Summer Olympics
Mediterranean Games bronze medalists for Slovenia
Mediterranean Games medalists in swimming
Swimmers at the 2018 Mediterranean Games